Gadari is a rural locality (a selo) in Gumbetovsky District, Republic of Dagestan, Russia. The population was 256 as of 2010. There are seven streets.

Geography 
Gadari is located 21 km northeast of Mekhelta (the district's administrative centre) by road. Danukh and Argvani are the nearest rural localities.

References 

Rural localities in Gumbetovsky District